Greenville is an unincorporated community in Chester Township, Wells County, in the U.S. state of Indiana.

It is close to the town of Poneto.

Geography

References

Unincorporated communities in Wells County, Indiana
Unincorporated communities in Indiana